Päidla is a village in Otepää Parish, Valga County in southeastern Estonia. Päidla has a population of 94 (as of 1 January 2011).

Besides the  Lake Mõrtsuka, there are several smaller lakes located in the village: Ahvenjärv, Kalmejärv, Kõverjärv, Mõisajärv, Näkijärv and Uibujärv. The landscape around the lakes is hilly.

Päidla Manor was first mentioned in 1522 as Krowelshof, later known as Samhof and Paidel. In the 19th century it was owned by explorer Alexander von Middendorff. Nowadays the manor buildings are destroyed, only an alley has survived.

Gallery

External links

References

Villages in Valga County
Kreis Dorpat